"Zero" is a song by American singer Chris Brown from his seventh studio album Royalty. It was released as a single on September 18, 2015, by RCA Records.

The song received positive reviews from music critics who noted it as one of the album's highlights, and celebrated its production, praising his 1980s sound including the use of talk box. The song peaked at number 80 on the Billboard Hot 100.

Composition and lyrics
"Zero" is a disco-funk song. The song was compared by some critics to the work of American band Chic and French electronic music duo Daft Punk. The funk elements are heard in the bass line and in the rhythm of the electric guitar in the chorus. A factor that is reminiscent of Daft Punk songs is the presence of a robotic voice edited with the vocoder in some parts of the song. Lyrically, in the song Brown sings about how he does not care about his break up with his ex-girlfriend, as he sings, "Ask how many nights I've been thinking of you, zero". Some critics speculated that the lyrics were dedicated to Brown's ex-girlfriend Karrueche Tran.

Cover artwork
The cover artwork is similar to artwork used in the 1985 manga City Hunter. The layout is practically identical with only minor variations such as skin tone. RCA does not give attribution for the song's artwork.

Critical reception
"Zero" received positive reviews from music critics. AllMusic editor Andy Kellman called the song a "disco-funk throwback replete with talkbox", noting some irony in writing, recording, and releasing a song bragging about not thinking of an ex. Marcus Dowling of HipHopDX said that the song and "No Filter", another song from Royalty, "pack in all of the aforementioned Rodgers' chugging grooves from Chic's 'Good Times', David Bowie's 'Let's Dance', and Daft Punk's 'Get Lucky' into one production". Mike Pizzo of Las Vegas Weekly praised his sound, but was not thrilled  towards its lyrical content saying "it's hard not to nod your head to the cheesy '80s grooves of 'Fine by Me' or 'Zero', even if the message is endlessly eye rolling." Jesse Cataldo of Slant Magazine praised the song saying that "'Zero' similarly has a pretty good neo-disco aesthetic, with warm synth washes and some genial Vocoder noodling, things that remind works from Daft Punk's Random Access Memories".

Music video
On August 7, 2015 a few images from the music video shoot were released online. On August 27, 2015, Brown uploaded a teaser for "Liquor/Zero" on his Instagram. The music video premiered on September 22, 2015, along with "Liquor" as one video.

Synopsis
The music video for "Liquor/Zero" was directed by Brown. In the “Zero” part of the video, Brown returns home after a long night and finds a girl he’s been seeing throwing his clothes off a balcony because she did not know where he was. Rather than get into an argument, Brown decides to gather his boys and go out, and after he dance starting in an alley and moves his way into a laundromat with his crew before taking the stage at downtown theater. At the end of the video there is a cameo by Dan Bilzerian.

Track listing 
Digital download
"Zero" (Explicit) — 3:33
Digital download
"Zero" (Clean) — 3:30

Charts

Weekly charts

Certifications

References

External links
 

2015 singles
2015 songs
Chris Brown songs
RCA Records singles
Songs written by Sean Douglas (songwriter)
Songs written by Matthew Burnett
Songs written by Chris Brown
Songs written by Talay Riley
Songs written by Tushar Apte